Noel Frederick Freeman (born 24 December 1938) is an Australian former athlete who competed mainly in the 20 kilometre walk.

Born in Preston, Victoria, Frederick competed for Australia in the 1960 Summer Olympics held in Rome in the 20 kilometre walk where he won the silver medal.  He was disqualified in the longer 50 km event whilst in the leading group.

Four years later he took fourth in the 20 km event in Tokyo.

In the 1970 Commonwealth Games in Edinburgh, he was the winner of the 20 mile walk, ahead of fellow Australian Bob Gardiner and Scot Bill Sutherland.

References

Sports Reference

1938 births
Living people
Australian male racewalkers
Olympic silver medalists for Australia
Athletes (track and field) at the 1960 Summer Olympics
Athletes (track and field) at the 1964 Summer Olympics
Olympic athletes of Australia
Athletes (track and field) at the 1970 British Commonwealth Games
Commonwealth Games gold medallists for Australia
Commonwealth Games medallists in athletics
Medalists at the 1960 Summer Olympics
Olympic silver medalists in athletics (track and field)
People from Preston, Victoria
Athletes from Melbourne
Medallists at the 1970 British Commonwealth Games